Hunte's Gardens is a botanical garden and significant tourist attraction in the St Joseph Area of central Barbados.

It was created from the 1950s by horticulturist Anthony Hunte in an unusual sinkhole-like gully. It contains a notable recreation of Caribbean forest and includes a plant collection of international importance.

See also
Andromeda Botanic Gardens, an authentic botanical garden in St Joseph, Barbados
Flower Forest, another garden in Barbados
San Juan Botanical Garden
St Vincent Botanical Gardens

External links
 

Parks in Barbados
Botanical gardens in Barbados
Gardens in Barbados
Saint Joseph, Barbados